Solomon Samson (1888–1957) was an educator, civil servant and politician in Newfoundland. He represented Twillingate in the Newfoundland House of Assembly from 1919 to 1923.

He was born in Flat Islands, Bonavista Bay and worked as a teacher in Catalina and Greenspond. In 1923, he was appointed to a position in the Customs department and moved to St. John's. He began writing poetry later in life and published a small volume of poems in 1952.

Works 
 Glimpse of Newfoundland (as it was and as it is) in Poetry and Pictures

References 

1888 births
1957 deaths
Newfoundland People's Party MHAs
Dominion of Newfoundland politicians